The Ministry of Civil Aviation is the Sri Lankan government ministry responsible for formulation of a more appropriate policy framework and efficient mechanism by which to offer competitive and qualitative aviation services in order to fulfill the local and international requirements in the aviation sector.

List of ministers 

The Minister of Civil Aviation is an appointment in the Cabinet of Sri Lanka.

Parties

See also 
 List of ministries of Sri Lanka

.
.
.
.
.
.

References

External links 
 Ministry of Civil Aviation
 Government of Sri Lanka

Civil Aviation
Civil Aviation
Civil aviation in Sri Lanka
Defunct transport organisations based in Sri Lanka